Zirkuiyeh (also Romanized as Zīrkū’īyeh; also known as Samkū’īyeh, Sertesh Chaqū, Sertschu, and Som Ku’iyeh) is a village in Asfyj Rural District, Asfyj District, Behabad County, Yazd Province, Iran. At the 2006 census, its population was 213, in 49 families.

References 

Populated places in Behabad County